Ursula Hedwig Meta Haverbeck-Wetzel ( Wetzel; born 8 November 1928) is a German activist from Vlotho. Since 2004, she has also been the subject of lawsuits and convicted due to her Holocaust denial, which in Germany is a criminal offense.

In November 2015, at the age of 87, she was sentenced to ten months' imprisonment for Holocaust denial. Several additional convictions in the fall of 2016 led to further such sentences. She unsuccessfully appealed all sentences, and on 7 May 2018 began to serve her latest two-year jail sentence after being picked up at her home by German police. Released from a prison in Bielefeld at the end of 2020, she was quickly charged again and was due to face a new trial in March 2022 and was sentenced to one year in prison

Life
Born at Winterscheid (today part of Gilserberg) in Hesse, Haverbeck-Wetzel, by her own account, lived in Sweden for four years as a homeland displaced person (Heimatvertriebene) from East Prussia and studied pedagogy, philosophy and linguistics, including two years in Scotland. For over fifty years, Haverbeck-Wetzel worked in the political shadow of her husband. After her husband's death in 1999, she took over many of his functions including chair of the international adult education establishment Heimvolkshochschule Collegium Humanum in Vlotho, North Rhine-Westphalia, which they both had founded in 1963. The Collegium Humanum was first active in the German environmental movement, and from the early 1980s openly turned to the right-wing extremism movement; the establishment was subsequently banned by the German Federal Ministry of the Interior (Bundesministerium des Innern) in 2008.

From 1983 until 1989, Haverbeck-Wetzel was also president of the World Union for Protection of Life (Section Germany), and disclosed in this non-governmental position her opposition towards the Western system and the Allied occupation of the Federal Republic of Germany. She was temporarily a member of the Ecological Democratic Party (ÖDP). In 1989, at the instigation of the ÖDP regional associations Bremen and North Rhine-Westphalia, she was excluded from the party, amongst other reasons because she attempted to organize a right-wing coalition of the ÖDP, NPD, and other groups.

In 1992, Haverbeck-Wetzel became first chairperson of the newly founded Memorial Sites Association (German: Verein Gedächtnisstätte e.V.), remaining in that position until 2003. The registered association was established in May 1992 with the statute to build a dignified remembrance for the German civilian victims of World War II by bombing, abduction, expulsion and detention centres, to end "the unjustified unilateral nature of the view of history and struggle to overcome the [negatives of the] past" (German: um "die ungerechtfertigte Einseitigkeit der Geschichtsbetrachtung und Vergangenheitsbewältigung" zu beenden).

Right-wing extremism
Well before Germany's reunification in 1990, Haverbeck-Wetzel cultivated connections to right-wing political groups like the NPD (National Democratic Party of Germany) with the aim of a major national collective movement in Germany. This orientation intensified in the years following. It was probably via this path that around 2000 she became acquainted with the Neo-nazi lawyer Horst Mahler. From this she became active as member and deputy director of the "Society for the Rehabilitation of Those Persecuted for Refutation of the Holocaust" (German ), which was founded in Vlotho on 9 November 2003, the anniversary of the Kristallnacht, and is chaired by the Swiss Holocaust denier Bernhard Schaub. Additionally, other Holocaust deniers, including Ernst Zündel (Canada), Robert Faurisson (France), Germar Rudolf, Jürgen Graf, Gerd Honsik, Wilhelm Stäglich, Fredrick Töben (Australia), Andres Studer, Hans-Dietrich Sander, Manfred Roeder, Frank Rennicke and Anneliese Remer were also involved in its establishment. The organization was banned in May 2008 by the German Federal Ministry of the Interior (Bundesministerium des Innern) on the grounds of being hostile to the constitution of Germany.

Publication and other offences

From 2004–14
In June 2004, the district court of Bad Oeynhausen sentenced Haverbeck to a €5,400 fine (180 days at €30 each) for incitement to hatred and Holocaust denial. In the house journal of the Collegium Humanum, the Voice of Conscience (Stimme des Gewissens), she had introduced a form of denial of the Holocaust, together with the editor of the magazine, Ernst-Otto Cohrs. The two incriminated publication issues were subsequently confiscated by the German authorities. In a subsequent issue of the Voice of Conscience it was again claimed that the mass destruction of the Jews was "a myth". Packaged in a citation by the Russian newspaper Russkiy Vestnik (the Russian Messenger) who had published in Russia a special revisionist analysis issue of Jürgen Graf's work, with the special Russkiy Vestnik issue later cited favourably in Moscow's newspaper Pravda by Valentin Prussakov, it was alleged that the number of Jewish victims of National Socialism did not amount to six million, but only about 500,000. On 10 March 2005, the court found a second case against Haverbeck-Wetzel and Cohrs. However, at the request of the Bielefeld Public Prosecutors Office the case was closed since "it was immaterial compared to another".

Another article by Haverbeck-Wetzel in the Voice of Conscience (November/December 2005) posited a thesis that Adolf Hitler was "just not to be understood from the believed Holocaust or his alleged war obsession, but only by a divine mission in the world-historical context." This triggered a renewed process for Holocaust denial, and in June 2007 another fine of 40 days at €30 each by the Dortmund Regional Court. Altogether a total fine of €6,000 (200 days at €30 each) was formed.

In June 2009, the District Court of Bad Oeynhausen found Haverbeck-Wetzel guilty of offending Charlotte Knobloch, president of the Central Council of Jews in Germany, who had earlier publicly advocated censorship of the Collegium Humanum Holocaust-deniers tools. Her open letter also contained hostility such as "Prepare yourself for the day of truth. It is near and unstoppable.", as well as "I warn you."..."If you continue as before, then a new pogrom could result, which would be horrific." Knobloch subsequently filed a criminal complaint, and Haverbeck-Wetzel was sentenced to a fine of €2,700.

Since 2014
In November 2014, Haverbeck-Wetzel lodged a police complaint against the Central Council of Jews in Germany. She accused the council of "persecution of innocent people". The investigation was abandoned in December 2014. The Bielefeld Public Prosecutors Office eventually examined proceedings against Haverbeck-Wetzel for false accusation.

In the ARD television broadcast series  produced by NDR in March 2015, and despite proceedings prohibiting, Haverbeck-Wetzel again denied the mass destruction of the Jews and discussed her views. She described "this Holocaust" as "the biggest and most persistent lie in history". Haverbeck-Wetzel published a video on YouTube protesting against the trial of Oskar Gröning, the so-called "Accountant of Auschwitz", and distributed leaflets outside the court which were reported to feature Holocaust denial.

Haverbeck-Wetzel became the subject of a new investigation initiated in June 2015 by the Bielefeld Public Prosecutors Office, in connection with a publication in the journal The Voice of the Empire (Die Stimme des Reiches), prompting Haverbeck-Wetzel's home as well as that of three other accused persons to be searched by the State Criminal Police Office of Lower Saxony (Landeskriminalamt Niedersachsen) for evidence. In November, after being found guilty, she was sentenced to ten months in prison. In the Hamburg court, she insisted the status of Auschwitz as a place of death is "not historically proven" and is "only a belief".

In September 2016, Haverbeck-Wetzel was sentenced to ten months imprisonment for Holocaust denial, without the option for parole, but remained free until an appeal was heard concerning the earlier case. She had written to Detmold's mayor, Rainer Heller, the previous February, insisting that Auschwitz was no more than a labour camp, and that those who survived were only "alleged witnesses"; that was after the trial of former Auschwitz SS guard Reinhold Hanning.

In October 2016, she was sentenced to 11 months in Bad Oeynhausen for incitement to hate. In court again the next month, Haverbeck-Wetzel was sentenced in Verden to 2 more years in jail for Holocaust denial, after restating her claims in Voice of the Reich (Stimme des Reiches).

Publications

Non-fiction

Werner G. Haverbeck: Der Weltkampf um den Menschen. Eine deutsche Selbstbesinnung (The world struggle for the man. A German self-reflection), Grabert Verlag, Tuebingen 1995, 
Werner G. Haverbeck: Der Weltkampf um die Gemeinschaft. Die Entwicklung der Demokratie zur Volksordnung (The world struggle for the community. The development of democracy into a people's order), Grabert Verlag, Tübingen 1996, 
with Erhard Eppler, Max Guede (eds.), Walter Hähnle (pub.): Bekommen wir eine andere Republik? (Do we get a different republic?), Radius-Verlag GmbH, Stuttgart 1982, 
with Martin Black, Claudio Mutti, Wolfgang Schüler, Oliver Ritter (eds.): Religion und Tradition (Religion and Tradition), Verlag Zeitenwende, Dresden 2002,

Further reading

Phillip Austen: Ursula Haverbeck. The maker of the Collegium Humanum - a portrait In: The right margin, No. 93, March / April 2005.

References

External links
 Ursula Haverbeck-Wetzel Official German website
 "Collegium Humanum": Braune Ikone hetzt weiter "Collegium Humanum": Brown icon incites further, publikative.org, 18 January 2011
 Antifaschistisches Info Blatt (AIB) Nr.70/1.2006: "Das Collegium Humanum - Ein Zentrum der Holocaustleugner" Anti-Fascists Fact Sheet No. 70/1.2006: "The Collegium Humanum - A centre of Holocaust deniers"
 HOLOCAUST "Göttlicher Auftrag", Focus Magazine Online, 25. Februar 2008 HOLOCAUST "Divine Order", Focus Magazine Online, 25 February 2008
 Westfalen Blatt - Holocaust-Leugnerin erneut vor Gericht, 4. Oktober 2010 Westfalen paper - Holocaust-denier again in court, 4 October 2010
 Holocaust-Leugnerin in der Heide  Holocaust-denier in the Heide, publikative.org, 30 March 2013

1928 births
Living people
People from Herford (district)
German people convicted of Holocaust denial
20th-century German writers
21st-century German writers
20th-century German women writers
21st-century German women writers
German neo-Nazis